The Confessions Tour was the seventh concert tour by American singer-songwriter Madonna, launched in support of her tenth studio album, Confessions on a Dance Floor (2005). The tour began in Inglewood on May 21, 2006, and ended in Tokyo on September 21, visiting North America and Eurasia. Like past tours of the singer, it was divided into different thematic acts: Equestrian, Bedouin, Never Mind the Bollocks, and Disco. It received generally positive reviews, although Madonna's performance of her 1986 single "Live to Tell", which found her hanging on a giant mirrored cross wearing a crown of thorns, was met with strong negative reaction from religious groups; the performance at Rome's Stadio Olimpico was condemned as an act of hostility toward the Roman Catholic Church by religious leaders. Madonna responded saying that her main intention with the performance was to bring attention to the millions of children dying in Africa.

Despite the controversy, the tour was a commercial success; tickets quickly sold out as soon as dates were announced, prompting organizers to add more. With a gross of over US$194.7 million ($ million in  dollars) from 60 shows with 1.2 million spectators, Confessions surpassed Cher's Living Proof: The Farewell Tour (2002–2005) as the highest-grossing tour for a female artist. It was awarded Most Creative Stage Production at the Pollstar Concert Industry Awards as well as Top Boxscore from the Billboard Touring Conference and Awards. Additionally, it was recognized as the highest-grossing music tour per concert in the 2007 edition of the Guinness World Records. The concerts on August at London's Wembley Arena were filmed professionally and broadcast as a live special on NBC titled Madonna: The Confessions Tour Live; afterwards, it was released as a live album and on DVD under the title The Confessions Tour.

Background 
In October 2005, Madonna performed "Hung Up", the lead single from her upcoming tenth studio album Confessions on a Dance Floor, at the MTV Europe Music Awards; she then brought up the idea of a concert tour when she said she would visit Australia, having not performed in the country for more than twelve years. Following the album's release in November, she embarked on a promotional campaign and appeared on several television programs such as  Wetten, dass..?, Entertainment Tonight and Access Hollywood. She also offered small concerts at London's KOKO and G-A-Y nightclubs. Later that month, she again mentioned the possibility of touring during an interview with Billboard; "if I go [on tour], it would be next summer. And it would be all out disco, with lots of disco balls". On an interview with The Guardian, she confirmed a tour for 2006, titled either Confessions or Confess Your Sins Tour. Jamie King, who had worked with the singer on her previous Re-Invention (2004) and Drowned World (2001) tours, told MTV she wanted to play small venues like New York City's Roseland Ballroom or the Wiltern Theatre in Los Angeles; "she likes things large, she likes things theatrical, but this time, being that [Confessions on a Dance Floor] is an intimate album, we want to try to make people have an intimate experience". The singer herself said she wanted "to do a little bit of everything", before moving on to stadiums and arenas; that way, she deduced, she would not feel bored during the performances.

The tour was confirmed by Madonna herself on February 9, 2006, during a visit to The Ellen DeGeneres Show; she added in a statement that she wanted to "turn the world into one big dance floor". It was set to follow her appearance at the Coachella Valley Music and Arts Festival, which was described as a "warm-up" for the tour. Titled Confessions Tour, dates were published on the singer's official website on April 3, with concerts on cities in the US, Canada, Europe and Japan. It officially kicked off at Inglewood's Great Western Forum, on May 21, and ended at the Tokyo Dome on September 21. The venue for the singer's first concert in Russia was switched from a hilltop site overlooking the city to Moscow's Luzhniki Stadium because of crowd control fears. On July, halfway through the tour, Madonna's manager Guy Oseary announced that the Australian leg had been dropped. The singer released a statement on her website:

Development 

Both Madonna and Jamie King confirmed the set list for the tour would include "a lot" of songs from Confessions on a Dance Floor; the former said she was interested in focusing on the new record, as she had already done the "old stuff" on the Re-Invention World Tour while, according to the latter, "people love it [the new album] and they want to hear it". King also said he wanted the tour to be "more interactive", thus he wanted to "put [Madonna] as close to her people — her fans, her dancers, her fellow supporters — as possible".

Production was headed by Chris Lamb while decisions were made "by committee", with Madonna having the final word. According to lighting designer Roy Bennett, the show was "extremely theatrical and very big", comparing it to "being in a nightclub or a disco". The stage was twice the size of Re-Invention's and included three runways that lead off to B-stages out in front and to each side of the venue; the main and largest one was lighted and ended in a small dance floor, while the smaller side runways had fences on them. The stage came equipped with a semi-circular, hydraulic rising and rotating center-stage, that had been used on Re-Invention, and three V9 LED screens that served as backdrops. Hung from above was a semi-circular LED "curtain" screen, that dropped down and covered the front of the center-stage during several numbers of the show to "add a 3D element", according to Bennett. Props included five disco balls hung from a central point that were lowered and raised for specific songs, a black mechanical saddle for "Like a Virgin" (1984); a narrow contraption of monkey bars, used for the performance of "Jump"; a crown of thorns supplied by Cotters Church Supply, a huge mirrored cross, and a massive fighting cage. The most expensive prop was a giant disco ball, from which the singer emerged at the beginning of each concert, encrusted with $2 million worth of Swarovski crystals. In total, 70 tons of equipment were used on top of the main stage; it took 2 private planes, 24 semi-trucks, 5 buses, 18 vans and cars to move the equipment from city to city. X-ray radiographies of the injuries Madonna suffered on a horse-riding accident were used as backdrops during the performance of "Like a Virgin".

The troupe included Madonna's lifelong backup singer and dancer Donna De Lory, vocalist Nicki Richards, Yitzhak Sinwani from the London Kabbalah Centre, Monte Pittman on guitar, Stuart Price as keyboards player, and 12 dancers, including Sofia Boutella and parkour veteran Sébastien Foucan, with whom the singer took parkour lessons. The concert was divided into different thematic segments, a custom for the singer's tours: Equestrian, Bedouin, Never Mind the Bollocks, and Disco. Jean Paul Gaultier was in charge of creating the tour's wardrobe. Designer Arianne Phillips, who collaborated with Gaultier, expressed that they based on "everything from Saturday Night Fever to Starlight Express to Fame"; for the first act, the singer got the idea of incorporating a horse riding theme after one time when Gaultier took her to Paris' Zingaro theatrical horse show, which she "loved". Gaultier then decided to have the show's male dancers portray horses, with built-in saddles, harnesses and small saddle-like accoutrements perched on one shoulder. For Madonna's outfit, which included a black top hat with a horse's tail, he took inspiration from a look worn by Romy Schneider in Luchino Visconti's 1973 film Ludwig. According to the designer, Madonna had "strong opinions" about how the clothes had to be made to withstand the demands of the choreography. Other ensambles designed by Gaultier included a "Biblical Chic" off-the-shoulder blouse and velvet cropped pants accessorized with the crown of thorns; jodhpurs, blouses and jackets made from "luxurious" fabrics such as taffeta, duchesse, satin, Chantilly lace and silk chiffon. In keeping with the disco theme of Confessions on a Dance Floor, the designer also created a white suit based on the one worn by John Travolta on Saturday Night Fever (1977), a white one-shouldered unitard with ribbons of purple Swarovski crystals across the torso, similar to the one worn by the singers of ABBA; a white satin cape, lit from the inside, that had "Dancing Queen" embroidered on the back, and a pink sparkling jumpsuit. The tour's official poster used pictures taken by Steven Klein of Madonna during her promotional concert at London's G-A-Y. Paul Oakenfold was hired as the opening act for selected European dates.

Concert synopsis 

The concert was divided into four segments: Equestrian, Bedouin, Never Mind the Bollocks, and Disco. It began with a video showing Madonna walking through a stable brandishing a riding crop, as dancers in leather bridles galloped throughout the three runways of the stage; then, a massive disco ball was lowered from the ceiling and opened like a flower bud to reveal Madonna inside, dressed in a skin-tight black riding outfit and wielding a crop. As she took her dancers' reins, she performed a mashup of "Future Lovers" and Donna Summer's "I Feel Love" (1977). The second number, "Get Together", saw Madonna writhing on the main catwalk. For "Like a Virgin", she rode a black leather-studded saddle while the backdrops depicted X-rays of her injuries. A steel monkey bars-like structure was lowered from the ceiling for "Jump"; Madonna sang while the dancers did parkour moves. Towards the end, the singer disappeared into the stage, giving way to an interlude called "Confessions", which featured three dancers narrating personal tragedies.

The Bedouin act began with "Live to Tell";  Madonna sang suspended from a giant mirrored cross, wearing a crown of thorns, as a death toll of African AIDS victims counted down on the screen above her. She stepped down off the cross to perform "Forbidden Love", which saw two men dancing with each other as blood cells flashed on the backdrops. "Isaac" began with Yitzhak Sinwani playing the horn; then, a female dancer in an oversized Middle-Eastern burqa danced inside an enormous cage with the backdrops displaying sand dunes. On "Sorry", which was performed with dancers inside of the cage, Madonna recreated the dance-off scene from the song's music video. "Like It or Not" closed the act and saw Madonna dancing alone with a chair. Afterwards, a video interlude depicting images of Adolf Hitler, Dick Cheney, Tony Blair, Osama bin Laden, Richard Nixon, George W. Bush, and starving African children played on the screens. Set to a remixed "Sorry", it featured dancers krumping on the runways.

"I Love New York" opened the Never Mind the Bollocks segment. The singer played electric guitar, decked out in a high-collared black leather jacket, and changed the song's line Just go to Texas/ Isn't that where they golf to a derogatory term aimed at George W. Bush; the backdrops for the performance depicted the New York skyline. "Ray of Light" was also sung with guitar and starbursts flashing on the screens. It counted with six male dancers dressed in black suits and white ties doing a synchronized choreography. For "Let It Will Be", Madonna danced energetically across the stage on her own, then sat down for a stripped rendition of "Drowned World/Substitute for Love". "Paradise (Not For Me)" was done by the singer and Yitzhak Sinwani. She played acoustic guitar as images of Cherry blossoms flashed onscreen.

The final segment, Disco, began with a video interlude of Madonna's past videos, set to radio-style mashup of "Borderline", "Erotica", "Dress You Up", "Holiday", and The Trammps "Disco Inferno" (1976). Several dancers in roller skates then appeared skating on the runways. Madonna emerged on scene dressed in the white Travolta-inspired suit to perform "Music"; the song included a sample of her 1986 song "Where's The Party" at the beginning. For "Erotica", she stripped down the suit to reveal a white leotard with purple stripes; the song's remix featured lyrics from the original demo known as "You Thrill Me", and saw the singer and troupe dancing ballroom-style. The next song was a dance version of "La Isla Bonita", where the screens displayed clips of tropical islands. A "modernized" "Lucky Star" was performed by Madonna, Donna De Lory and Nicki Richards. Towards the end of the number, the song's beat slowly changed to that of "Hung Up", the concert's final number. This performance featured a sing-along with the audience and, at one point, confetti and golden balloons fell from the roof. The show ended as the phrase "Have you confessed?" appeared onscreen.

Critical reception 

The Confessions Tour received generally positive reviews. Writing for The San Diego Union-Tribune, Don Chareunsy opined that Madonna's previous tours, Drowned World and Re-Invention, "were excellent concerts [...] but she stepped it up a few notches" for the Confessions Tour. Ben Wener from the Orange County Register reported that "No one – but no one – stages elaborate eye-candy productions like Madonna", adding that the "highly impressive" Confessions Tour was "multimedia, cross-cultural preaching to the choir on a scale only U2 has reached lately". According to The Palm Beach Posts Leslie Gray Streeter, Confessions was "an exciting testament to energy, longevity and the sheer love of a beat". Slants Ed Gonzalez wrote that, "though spotty and compromised but often breathtaking, [Confessions] is something of a coup after the fierce but icy theatrics of her Drowned World Tour and the shrill aggression of her Re-Invention Tour", and noted that Madonna "risked a personal connection with her fans unseen since the Girlie Show". Entertainment Weeklys Chris Willman hailed it "two hours of unbridled horseplay - and fun", as well has her "most enthralling" concert, and gave it an A− grade. Brynn Mandel, from the Republican-American, noticed how, for two hours "Madge kept her audience engaged, providing visual accompaniment as only she can to a list of hits, both recent and classic [...] only icons can deliver a show like this"; the author concluded by saying: "though nothing less has come to be expected of the Material Girl, she once again proved herself not just a singer but an entertainer extraordinaire". The Sunday Times said Confessions found Madonna "doing what she is best at, and doing it brilliantly".

The Globe and Mails Matthew Hays considered Confessions an "example of the artist at her best: energetic, naughty, brazenly kitschy and wildly entertaining". Hays also wrote that the singer "seemed intent on proving something [...] that she still knows how to have fun [...] To accomplish that, she needed to captivate [...] to nod to her past while maintaining the aura of an artist whose best is before her [and] she delivered". Writing for PopMatters, Christian John Wikane felt that "even the most rabid anti-Madonna listener or cynical music lover would find elements of 'The Confessions Tour' impressive". The staff of the East Valley Tribune highlighted the singer's vocals, her "impeccable shape", and how "[Confessions] delivered on all sensory levels, [and] fans were not disappointed". According to Edna Gundersen from USA Today, "Madonna is as fit vocally as physically, effortlessly nailing tender passages or a demanding upper register after strenuous bump-and-grind workouts". The Boston Heralds Christopher John Treacy affirmed that, "although it’s impossible to tell how much vocal management is going on during the more demanding, theatrical numbers, Madonna sounded rehearsed and on target" during the tour. For The Guardians Kitty Empire, the "finest moments in her set are all about physical movement", citing the performance of "Let It Will Be" as an example. Chris Willman also highlighted "Let It Will Be" as one of the best numbers, and deemed it "as rock & roll as anything Courtney Love will ever do". Ed Gonzalez praised the performances of "Get Together", "I Love New York", "Ray of Light", "Erotica" and "Lucky Star"; Brynn Mandel singled out the "requisite" "Like a Virgin", while Leslie Gray Streeter praised the "Music" number, included on the "delightful" and "campy" Disco segment. Writing for the Chicago Tribune, Greg Kot highlighted the gay themes included on "Forbidden Love"; "the intent was unmistakable, and moving. Madonna has been a gay icon since she emerged in the New York City clubs more than 20 years ago, and with gay rights once again under attack, her gesture did not go unnoticed". According to Wales Online, "we were promised a spectacle and that's what we got. While the songs were powerful, [...] it was the all-round theatrics of the performance that threatened to leave the audience speechless. [Madonna] was a ringleader on the stage drawing everyone into her world, if only for two hours". The Miami Herald concluded that, although Confessions "lacks the surprise of 2001's Drowned World Tour and some of the better tunes from 2004's Re-Invention Tour [...] [Madonna] seemed to be enjoying herself more on this one and so did we".

Eric R. Danton, from the Hartford Courant, classified Confessions as a "club-friendly two-hour set, packed with throbbing beats and ethereal, trance-like vocals", but noted that the music was "almost incidental - it could have been piped in. This show was about production values, and though Madonna was the star, the stage was the true focal point". In a similar, albeit less enthusiast review, Greg Kot pointed out that "nothing in Madonna's world, at least on stage, is less than expertly managed. And it gave most of the show the air of a somewhat joyless big production [...] A good time may have been had by all, but no real connection was made". Although Ben Wener praised the second segment, Bedouin, he was critical of what followed, concluding that only "Drowned World/Substitute for Love" and "Paradise (Not For Me)" evoked the "thought-provoking sentiments" from earlier moments. Sandy Cohen from The Washington Post opined that Madonna "looked happiest when she was dancing, microphone at her side", and highlighted the numbers featuring Yitzhak Sinwani as the "most interesting". Although she singled out the "lively and festive" songs of the Disco section, Cohen ended her review on a mixed note: "the production was so tightly choreographed, it left little room for spontaneity. Even when Madonna flipped the crowd the bird, it felt scripted, not subversive". Matthew Hays noticed that Madonna sang some of her older hits, such as "Lucky Star", with "far less enthusiasm".

Reviews for the concert in Denmark were mixed. It was referred to as "impressive" and "spectacular" by Berlingske Tidende, while other reviewers had "high praise" for the show's opening and closing, but said it lost its energy in the middle, where the singer slipped into a "robotic and boring act". The choice of venue was also criticized; according to The Copenhagen Post, "maybe some 10,000 of the 85,000 people who were there could see Madonna. The majority of the audience couldn't even see the screens that were put up". A negative review came from The Independents Simon Price, who panned the "crass, fatuous, mindless symbolism [with] precious little meaning", and the Never Mind the Bollocks act; "her attempts at being punky are embarrassing: falling to her knees with her guitar, looking less like Iggy, and more like Charlie Dimmock". Price also dismissed the singer's "attempts at being sexy [...] When she takes her top off, or shoves her hand inside her pants, I involuntarily think of the gran who gets her toes sucked in Little Britain". At the 2006 Pollstar Concert Industry Awards, Confessions was awarded Most Creative Stage Production.

In 2015, Confessions was named the singer's third best concert tour by both The Advocates Gina Vivinetto and VH1's Christopher Rosa, with the latter calling it "one of Madge’s most ambitious treks ever". Six years later, The Odyssey's Rocco Papa ranked it her second best tour, writing that it "offered a healthy mix of depth and fun, with a bit of politics thrown in for good measure [...] this tour saw a more mature Madonna, but one that still wanted to provoke and have fun".

Controversy surrounding the performance of "Live to Tell" 

The tour's performance of "Live to Tell" (1986) faced strong reaction from religious groups, as it found Madonna wearing a crown of thorns while being raised on a mirrored cross, simulating a crucifixion; the backdrop screen flashed a running tally of the 12 million children in Africa orphaned by AIDS. German prosecutors in Düsseldorf threatened to sue her for blasphemy, with Protestant bishop Margot Käßmann expressing that "maybe the only way an aging superstar can attract attention is to offend people's religious sentiments", and encouraging people to "ignore" the singer. The Russian Orthodox Church and the Federation of Jewish Communities of Russia (FJCR) described the number as amoral, and urged the public not to attend the concert in Moscow. The performance done at Rome's Olympic Stadium —located near the Vatican— was condemned as an act of hostility toward the Roman Catholic Church by religious leaders; Italian cardinal Ersilio Tonini considered it a "scandal created on purpose by astute merchants to attract publicity", while Mario Scialoja, president of the country's Muslim World League, said that "it's not the first time Madonna stages such an act. We deplore it". According to Riccardo Pacifici, spokesman for Rome's Jewish community, Madonna's actions were "a disrespectful act, and to do it in Rome is even worse". A spokesperson for the Catholic Church in England and Wales said believers would be offended by the number; "the crucifixion is at the heart of the story of God becoming man and suffering to redeem us. To use it as a stage prop is a banal perversion of that magnificent event". A pastor from North Denver defended the "powerful and very reverent performance" which "calls the world to take notice that there are 12 million children who are currently orphaned"; he also applauded Madonna for "trying to wake us up to [...] care for those who are most often forgotten". The singer stood by the number, claiming that Jesus wouldn't be mad at "the message I'm trying to send"; she also released a statement:
"I am very grateful that my show was so well received all over the world. But there seems to be many misinterpretations about my appearance on the cross and I wanted to explain it myself once and for all. There is a segment in my show where three of my dancers 'confess' or share harrowing experiences from their childhood that they ultimately overcame. My 'confession' follows and takes place on a Crucifix that I ultimately come down from. This is not a mocking of the church. It is no different than a person wearing a Cross or 'Taking Up the Cross' as it says in the Bible. My performance is neither anti-Christian, sacrilegious or blasphemous. Rather, it is my plea to the audience to encourage mankind to help one another and to see the world as a unified whole. I believe in my heart that if Jesus were alive today he would be doing the same thing.

My specific intent is to bring attention to the millions of children in Africa who are dying every day, and are living without care, without medicine and without hope. I am asking people to open their hearts and minds to get involved in whatever way they can. The song ends with a quote from the Bible's Book of Matthew: 'For I was hungry and you gave me food. I was naked and you gave me clothing. I was sick and you took care of me and God replied, 'Whatever you did for the least of my brothers... you did it to me.'

Please do not pass judgment without seeing my show".
Despite the controversy, critical reception towards the number ranged from lukewarm to negative; Leslie Gray Streeter, who gave the overall concert a positive review, opined that it "slowed down, in an unsatisfying way" in "preachy" performances such as "Live to Tell". The Mercury News Marian Liu felt that, "while visually stunning, the depiction wasn't anything new in the music world". Similarly, Greg Kot said that "now that everyone from Kanye West to Madonna way back in the '80s has flirted with this particular brand of sacrilege, crucifixion just isn't what it used to be in the Shock and Awe department". The staff of Newsday wrote: "Was it tasteless? Was it offensive? One thing's for sure - it was one of the show's few dull points". Rick Massimo considered the number an example of the "jump-cut philosophy" that made the singer's previous Re-Invention World Tour a "weird mess". While Chris Willman chastised Madonna for trying "to make like Bono" and "channel[ing] global suffering", Ed Gonzalez was doubtful of her "sincerity" and named "Live to Tell" the tour's "one serious moral lapse". For the East Bay Times, the message came off as "deep as a bumper sticker [...] On one hand it was kind of fun just for the shock value. On the other, the stunt aspect and bad sound nearly obliterated the effect of a song that's so much better when standing quietly alone". Eric R. Danton  deemed it "more funny than controversial", and compared it to a "press conference from Calvary as imagined by Monty Python". The Philadelphia Inquirer panned the performance for being "disappointingly static" and a "most desperate attempt to shock". One positive review came from Wales Online, who praised the "powerful" rendition.

Commercial reception 

The Confessions Tour was commercially successful; after it kicked off, it was predicted to gross $190 million. The Daily Telegraph reported that, within the first four days of ticket sales, the singer had sold out 28 shows, including New York, Los Angeles, Chicago, Miami, Paris and London. The first two concerts at New York's Madison Square Garden sold out in 10 minutes, prompting organizers to add two more dates, which quickly sold out as well, leading to a fifth date being added. According to Le Devoir, Madonna sold 30,000 tickets in under 40 minutes in Montreal. The Guardian then reported that tickets for the first two concerts at London's Wembley Arena had also sold out within ten minutes of going on sale; fans crashed the singer's website and queued outside the venue in order to get a purchase. As a result, seven more dates were added. The single concert in Cardiff was estimated to have been attended by an audience of more than 60,000; Wales Online reported that fans went as far as to set up camp outside the box office. A second concert was added in Prague after tickets for the first one sold out in a record time of less than two hours; prices ranged from 3,060 to 5,010 Kčs. The single concert in Horsens, Denmark attracted 85,000 people and became one of the largest in the country. 37,000 tickets for the sole Moscow concert sold out in three days.

Upon completion, Billboard, and tour producer Arthur Fogel, reported that Confessions had grossed over $194.7 million ($ in  dollars) from 60 shows and had played to an audience of 1.2 million, becoming the highest-grossing tour ever for a female artist, and breaking the record previously held by Cher's Living Proof: The Farewell Tour (2002–2005); "Madonna has yet again delivered an incredible show for her fans, and the success of the tour is the ultimate statement [...] she absolutely belongs at number one", expressed Fogel. Additionally, the Confessions Tour earned Madonna a place in the 2007 edition of the Guinness World Records: highest-grossing music tour per concert. It won Top Boxscore at the 2006 Billboard Touring Conference and Awards.

Broadcast and recording 

On July 21, Access Hollywood reported that NBC would broadcast the concerts at London's Wembley Arena as the network's first special with the singer; executive Kevin Reilly said that "Madonna is one of the greatest artists of our time and never fails to generate excitement [...] this is going to be a big event for television". According to CBS News, the Catholic League wrote a letter to NBC executives, urging that the crucifixion performance of "Live to Tell" be omitted from the special. When asked, Kevin Reilly said that the number would probably be included in the broadcast, adding that Madonna "felt strongly about it", he further explained: "We viewed it and, although Madonna is known for being provocative, we didn't see it as being inappropriate". Ultimately, the performance was cut from the transmission, albeit not entirely; different camera angles were used so that the singer would not be seen until she gets off the cross. Madonna: The Confessions Tour Live aired on November 22, one night before thanksgiving; ratings were low, with the special ending up fourth in its time slot.

On January 30, 2007, it was released as a live album and DVD under the title The Confessions Tour; it received generally positive reviews, with AllMusic's Stephen Thomas Erlewine praising the "sonic cohesion that's about as stylized and chilly as its accompanying album". The Confessions Tour peaked at number fifteen on the United States' Billboard 200 albums chart and won a Best Music Film Grammy at the 50th ceremony. Madonna: Confessions, a photography book by Guy Oseary was released on October 1, 2008. It was created to "showcase[s] the provocative themes of [Madonna's] live performances"; all author proceeds were donated to Raising Malawi, Madonna's nonprofit organization.

Set list 
Set list, samples and notes adapted per Madonna's official website, the notes and track listing of The Confessions Tour, and additional sources.

Act 1: Equestrian
 "Future Lovers" / "I Feel Love"
 "Get Together"
 "Like a Virgin"
 "Jump"
 "Confessions" 
Act 2: Bedouin
"Live to Tell" 
 "Forbidden Love"
 "Isaac"
 "Sorry"
 "Like It or Not"
 "Sorry" 
Act 3: Never Mind the Bollocks
"I Love New York" 
 "Ray of Light"
 "Let It Will Be" 
 "Drowned World/Substitute for Love"
 "Paradise (Not for Me)"
Act 4: Disco
"The Duke Mixes The Hits" 
 "Music" 
 "Erotica" / "You Thrill Me"
 "La Isla Bonita"
 "Lucky Star" 
 "Hung Up"

Shows

Notes

Personnel 
Adapted from the Confessions Tour program.

Band 
Madonna –  creator, vocals, guitar
Donna De Lory - vocals
Nicki Richards - vocals
Yitzhak Sinwani - additional vocals
Stuart Price - musical director, keyboards, programmer
Marcus Brown - keyboards
Monte Pittman - guitar
Steve Sidelnyk - drums

Dancers 
Addie Yungmee-Schilling-George - dance captain
Jason Young - dance captain
Charmaine Jordan - dancer
Daniel "Cloud" Campos - dancer
Leroy Barnes Jr. - dancer
Levi Meeuwenberg - dancer
Mihran Kirakosian - dancer
Reshma Gajjar - dancer
Sofia Boutella - dancer
Steve Neste - dancer
Tamara Levinson - dancer
William Charlemoine - dancer
Sébastien Foucan - parkour
Victor Lopez - parkour

Choreographers 
Jamie King - choreographer
Richmond and Anthony Talauega - choreographers
RJ Durell - choreographer
Liz Imperio - choreographer
Alison Faulk - choreographer
Fred Tallaksen - roller skate choreographer
April Corle - roller skate choreographer assistant
Ralph Montejo - choreographer
Boppendre - choreographer
Laurie Ann Gibson - choreographer
Gabriel Castillo - choreographer

Wardrobe 
Jean-Paul Gaultier - designer
Arianne Phillips - designer

Crew 
Angela Becker - manager
Guy Oseary - manager
Arthur Fogel - tour producer
Liz Rosenberg - publicist
Jamie King - creative director
Chris Lamb - production director
Gina Brookee - make-up artist
Andy LeCompte - hair stylist
Giovanni Bianco - art direction, graphic design
Steven Klein - tourbook photography, video projection 
Annika Aschberg - photography
Johan Renck - "Hung Up" video stills director
Jamie King - "Sorry" video stills director
Christian Lamb - video projection director
Dustin Robertson - video projection director
Jeff Bertuch - Lighting FOH Tech

References

External links 

 Madonna.com > Tours > Confessions Tour
 Official TV website NBC

Madonna concert tours
2006 concert tours
Music controversies